Streptomyces sodiiphilus is an alkaliphilic bacterium species from the genus of Streptomyces which has been isolated from a muddy sample from the Chaka salt lake in the Qinghai Province in China.

See also 
 List of Streptomyces species

References

Further reading

External links
Type strain of Streptomyces sodiiphilus at BacDive -  the Bacterial Diversity Metadatabase

sodiiphilus
Bacteria described in 2005